Gorontalo may refer to:

 Gorontalo (province), a province of Indonesia on the northern part of Sulawesi island
 Gorontalo Regency, a regency within the province
 Gorontalo (city), capital of the province
 Gorontaloan people, people native to the province
 Gorontalo language, spoken in the province
 Gorontalo peninsula, founded on 8th century
 Gorontalo of Tidore (d. 1639), a sultan in Maluku